Sunningdale Barrow is the site of three Bronze Age round barrows, including one bowl barrow near Sunningdale railway station, Sunningdale, now in Berkshire but formerly in Surrey. Excavations on one barrow located cremations, mainly inurned.

External links 

S'dale Barrows, www.chobham.info
Sunningdale Barrow, www.themodernantiquarian.com
Sunningdale Barrow, www.megalithic.co.uk

Barrows in the United Kingdom
Archaeological sites in Berkshire
Bronze Age sites in Berkshire
Archaeological sites in Surrey